Naomh Barróg are a Dublin based Gaelic Athletic Association club.

History
Gaelic games were introduced to the parish of Kilbarrack –Foxfield through the Scoil Lorcain school, which enjoyed success in Cumann na mBunscoil competitions in 1972, 1973, and 1974.

Following the interest and enthusiasm created by these achievements it was decided to form a local GAA club. At a meeting attended by 8 people in Scoil Lorcain on 5 September 1974, Naomh Barróg GAA club was formed.

The club title being adopted after a 6th-century founder of a church in Kilbarrack, the remains of which still survive in Kilbarrack graveyard. In the clubs’ first year 4 teams were entered in North Dublin GAA competitions. From these beginnings the club now fields football teams at all levels from U9 to Senior, hurling from U9 to Junior, and Ladies football from U10 to Junior.

Among the many successes enjoyed by the club are 2 national Feile na nGael titles. Naomh Barróg has also won a title at every football level from U10 to Intermediate.

The club ground, Pairc Barróg, was acquired in 1982, developed, and officially opened in September 1984. During its history, Naomh Barróg has expanded to now include membership from not only Kilbarrack-Foxfield, but, the neighboring areas of Bayside, Baldoyle, Sutton Park, Donaghmede and Grange-Woodbine.

With full and social membership now totaling over 1000 Naomh Barrógs’ new clubhouse was opened on 14 July 2001. This superb facility is the jewel in the clubs crown, and is a new sporting and social focal point as Naomh Barróg looks forward to an exciting and successful future.

Naomh Barróg currently have Senior Hurling status and play in Dublin Senior Hurling League Div 1
. Barróg footballers currently have Intermediate status and compete in AFL Div 2.

Achievements
 Dublin AHL Division 2  Winners 2019
 Dublin Junior Football Championship Winners 1981
 Dublin AFL Division 3 Winner 2019 
 Dublin Junior B Hurling Championship 2004
 Leinster Special Junior Hurling Championship Winners (1) 2008
 Dublin Minor B Hurling Championship Winners 2006
 Dublin Minor C Hurling Championship Winners 2005

External links
Naomh Barróg Official GAA Website

Gaelic games clubs in Dublin (city)